An order of magnitude is an approximation of the logarithm of a value relative to some contextually understood reference value, usually 10, interpreted as the base of the logarithm and the representative of values of magnitude one. Logarithmic distributions are common in nature and considering the order of magnitude of values sampled from such a distribution can be more intuitive. When the reference value is 10, the order of magnitude can be understood as the number of digits in the base-10 representation of the value. Similarly, if the reference value is one of some powers of 2, since computers store data in a binary format, the magnitude can be understood in terms of the amount of computer memory needed to store that value.

Differences in order of magnitude can be measured on a base-10 logarithmic scale in “decades” (i.e., factors of ten). Examples of numbers of different magnitudes can be found at Orders of magnitude (numbers).

Definition
Generally, the order of magnitude of a number is the smallest power of 10 used to represent that number. To work out the order of magnitude of a number , the number is first expressed in the following form:

Then,  represents the order of magnitude of the number. The order of magnitude can be any integer. The table below enumerates the order of magnitude of some numbers in light of this definition:

This definition has the effect of lowering the values of  slightly:

Yet others restrict  to values where , making the order of magnitude of a number exactly equal to its exponent part in scientific notation.

Uses
Orders of magnitude are used to make approximate comparisons.  If numbers differ by one order of magnitude, x is about ten times different in quantity than y.  If values differ by two orders of magnitude, they differ by a factor of about 100. Two numbers of the same order of magnitude have roughly the same scale: the larger value is less than ten times the smaller value.
The growing amounts of Internet data have led to addition of new SI prefixes over time, most recently in 2022.

Calculating the order of magnitude
The order of magnitude of a number is, intuitively speaking, the number of powers of 10 contained in the number.  More precisely, the order of magnitude of a number can be defined in terms of the common logarithm, usually as the integer part of the logarithm, obtained by truncation.  For example, the number  has a logarithm (in base 10) of 6.602; its order of magnitude is 6.  When truncating, a number of this order of magnitude is between 106 and 107. In a similar example, with the phrase "He had a seven-figure income", the order of magnitude is the number of figures minus one, so it is very easily determined without a calculator to 6. An order of magnitude is an approximate position on a logarithmic scale.

Order-of-magnitude estimate
An order-of-magnitude estimate of a variable, whose precise value is unknown, is an estimate rounded to the nearest power of ten. For example, an order-of-magnitude estimate for a variable between about 3 billion and 30 billion (such as the human population of the Earth) is 10 billion. To round a number to its nearest order of magnitude, one rounds its logarithm to the nearest integer. Thus , which has a logarithm (in base 10) of 6.602, has 7 as its nearest order of magnitude, because "nearest" implies rounding rather than truncation. For a number written in scientific notation, this logarithmic rounding scale requires rounding up to the next power of ten when the multiplier is greater than the square root of ten (about 3.162). An order-of-magnitude estimate is sometimes also called a zeroth order approximation.

Order of magnitude difference
An order-of-magnitude difference between two values is a factor of 10.  For example, the mass of the planet Saturn is 95 times that of Earth, so Saturn is two orders of magnitude more massive than Earth.  Order-of-magnitude differences are called decades when measured on a logarithmic scale.

Non-decimal orders of magnitude

Other orders of magnitude may be calculated using bases other than 10. The ancient Greeks ranked the nighttime brightness of celestial bodies by 6 levels in which each level was the fifth root of one hundred (about 2.512) as bright as the nearest weaker level of brightness, and thus the brightest level being 5 orders of magnitude brighter than the weakest indicates that it is (1001/5)5 or a factor of 100 times brighter.

The different decimal numeral systems of the world use a larger base to better envision the size of the number, and have created names for the powers of this larger base. The table shows  what number the order of magnitude aim at for base 10 and for base . But the number names billion, trillion themselves (here with other meaning than in the first chapter) are not names of the orders of magnitudes, they are names of "magnitudes", that is the numbers  etc.

SI units in the table at right are used together with SI prefixes, which were devised with mainly base 1000 magnitudes in mind. The IEC standard prefixes with base 1024 were invented for use in electronic technology.

The ancient apparent magnitudes for the brightness of stars uses the base  and is reversed. The modernized version has however turned into a logarithmic scale with non-integer values.

Extremely large numbers
For extremely large numbers, a generalized order of magnitude can be based on their double logarithm or super-logarithm. Rounding these downward to an integer gives categories between very "round numbers", rounding them to the nearest integer and applying the inverse function gives the "nearest" round number.

The double logarithm yields the categories:
 ..., 1.0023–1.023, 1.023–1.26, 1.26–10, 10–1010, 1010–10100, 10100–10, ...
(the first two mentioned, and the extension to the left, may not be very useful, they merely demonstrate how the sequence mathematically continues to the left).

The super-logarithm yields the categories:
0–1, 1–10, 10–1010, 1010–101010, 101010–10101010, ... or

0–010, 010–110, 110–210, 210–310, 310–410, ...

The "midpoints" which determine which round number is nearer are in the first case:
1.076, 2.071, 1453, ,...
and, depending on the interpolation method, in the second case
−0.301, 0.5, 3.162, ,... (see notation of extremely large numbers)

For extremely small numbers (in the sense of close to zero) neither method is suitable directly, but the generalized order of magnitude of the reciprocal can be considered.

Similar to the logarithmic scale one can have a double logarithmic scale (example provided here) and super-logarithmic scale. The intervals above all have the same length on them, with the "midpoints" actually midway. More generally, a point midway between two points corresponds to the generalised f-mean with f(x) the corresponding function log log x or slog x. In the case of log log x, this mean of two numbers (e.g. 2 and 16 giving 4) does not depend on the base of the logarithm, just like in the case of log x (geometric mean, 2 and 8 giving 4), but unlike in the case of log log log x (4 and  giving 16 if the base is 2, but not otherwise).

See also
 Big O notation
 Decibel
 Mathematical operators and symbols in Unicode
 Names of large numbers
 Names of small numbers
 Number sense
 Orders of magnitude (acceleration)
 Orders of magnitude (area)
 Orders of magnitude (current)
 Orders of magnitude (energy)
 Orders of magnitude (force)
 Orders of magnitude (frequency)
 Orders of magnitude (length)
 Orders of magnitude (mass)
 Orders of magnitude (numbers)
 Orders of magnitude (power)
 Orders of magnitude (pressure)
 Orders of magnitude (radiation)
 Orders of magnitude (speed)
 Orders of magnitude (temperature)
 Orders of magnitude (time)
 Orders of magnitude (voltage)
 Orders of magnitude (volume)
 Powers of Ten
 Scientific notation
 Unicode symbols for CJK Compatibility includes SI Unit symbols
 Valuation (algebra), an algebraic generalization of "order of magnitude"
 Scale (analytical tool)

References

Further reading
 Asimov, Isaac, The Measure of the Universe (1983).

External links
 The Scale of the Universe 2  Interactive tool from Planck length 10−35 meters to universe size 1027
 Cosmos – an Illustrated Dimensional Journey from microcosmos to macrocosmos – from Digital Nature Agency
 Powers of 10, a graphic animated illustration that starts with a view of the Milky Way at 1023 meters and ends with subatomic particles at 10−16 meters.
 What is Order of Magnitude?

Orders of magnitude
Elementary mathematics
Logarithmic scales of measurement